Metropolitan Filmexport is a French film distribution company founded by brothers Samuel and Victor Hadida, along with their father David, in 1978. It distributes films in France, alongside Entertainment One in Canada, United Kingdom, Australia, Germany, Spain and the Benelux countries and FilmNation Entertainment worldwide.

Distribution
Metropolitan Filmexport currently distributes or has distributed all or some of the following companies' films:

Current distribution deals
 STX Entertainment
 A24
 Lionsgate Films
 Annapurna Pictures
 Lantern Entertainment
 Amblin Partners
 Bleecker Street
 Millennium Media
 Open Road Films (formerly Global Road Entertainment from 2017-2019)

Former distribution deals
 New Line Cinema – Warner Bros. took direct control in 2009. 
 Relativity Media/Rogue Pictures – went bankrupt as a mini-major in 2015.
 DreamWorks – retired as a distributor in 2005 and then became a banner of Amblin Partners in 2015.
 Broad Green Pictures – Shut down its production unit in 2017 and then shut down completely in 2018.
 CBS Films – Lionsgate took over distribution in 2015.
 United International Pictures (Paramount Pictures/Universal Pictures/Focus Features) – Stopped French distribution in 2007 as part of its effort to reduce International operations.  Paramount and Universal distribute in France because of this move.
 Fine Line Features/Picturehouse – Part of New Line Cinema and shut down between 2005 and 2008.
 The Weinstein Co. – plagued by the Harvey Weinstein sexual abuse scandal.
 20th Century Fox/Fox Searchlight Pictures – Formed a joint venture with UGC named UGC Fox Distribution in 1995, which disestablished a decade later.
 Sony (Columbia Pictures/TriStar Pictures/Screen Gems/Stage 6 Films/Triumph Films/Destination Films) – Formed a joint venture with Gaumont Film Company for French distribution named Gaumont Columbia Tristar Films in 2004.  The joint venture disestablished three years later.
 Samuel Goldwyn Films
 Metro-Goldwyn-Mayer/United Artists/Orion Pictures

References

External links
 Official website

Film distributors of France
Mass media companies established in 1978
French companies established in 1978
Metropolitan Filmexport films